Tridactylus berlandi is a species of pygmy mole cricket endemic to Vietnam.  The type specimen was taken from the southern region ("Cochinchine") and is deposited in the National Museum of Natural History, France.

References 

Tridactylidae
Orthoptera of Vietnam
Endemic fauna of Vietnam
Insects described in 1920